Clarence Leo Best (April 21, 1878 – September 22, 1951, San Francisco, California), usually known as C. L. Best, was an American manufacturing executive. C. L. Best founded the C. L. Best Gas Traction Company in 1910 (later the C. L. Best Tractor Company) then merged his company with Holt Manufacturing Company to form Caterpillar Tractor Company in 1925. C. L. Best was chairman of the board of Caterpillar Tractor Company from its founding until his death in 1951.

Biography

C. L. Best started out working for Best Manufacturing Company, owned by his father, Daniel Best, and eventually became manager of Best Manufacturing Company's Stockton, California plant.

Best Manufacturing Company was acquired by Holt Manufacturing Company in 1908. In 1910, C. L. Best left Holt Manufacturing Company and formed his own company, C. L. Best Gas Traction Company, to continue his father's work.

Originally operating out of a plant in Elmhurst, California, the C. L. Best Traction Company became large enough to purchase Daniel Best's former San Leandro, California plant in mid-1916. In 1920, the C. L. Best Traction Company was restructured and renamed the C. L. Best Tractor Company. The most successful tractor produced was the C. L. Best 60 Tracklayer, later produced as the Caterpillar Sixty.

In the mid-1920s, Holt encountered financial trouble. Best's financial backers approached Holt executives to discuss a merger. On April 15, 1925 C. L. Best Tractor Company and Holt Manufacturing Company merged to form Caterpillar Tractor Company (later Caterpillar Inc.).  C. L. Best remained chairman of the board of Caterpillar until his death in 1951.

He was interred at Evergreen Cemetery in Oakland, CA.

References

1878 births
1951 deaths
Burials at Evergreen Cemetery (Oakland, California)
Businesspeople from California
Caterpillar Inc. people
People from Stockton, California
San Leandro, California